Makjangbong is a mountain of South Korea. It has an elevation of 868 metres.

See also
List of mountains of Korea

References

Mountains of South Korea